Gerard Wybo Veldman, known as Wybo Veldman (born 21 October 1946, in Padang, Indonesia, of Dutch parents) is a former New Zealand rower who won an Olympic gold medal at the 1972 Summer Olympics in Munich. He teamed with Dick Joyce, Tony Hurt, John Hunter, Lindsay Wilson, Joe Earl, Trevor Coker and Gary Robertson and Simon Dickie (cox) to win the gold medal in the eights. Veldman had previously been in the crew of the eight that finished fourth at the 1968 Summer Olympics in Mexico City. Veldman won a then record 21 New Zealand national rowing titles.

Veldman was later a farmer in Ohakune.

References 

 New Zealand Olympic Committee

External links
 

1946 births
New Zealand male rowers
Olympic gold medalists for New Zealand in rowing
Rowers at the 1968 Summer Olympics
Rowers at the 1972 Summer Olympics
Living people
New Zealand people of Dutch descent
Medalists at the 1972 Summer Olympics
World Rowing Championships medalists for New Zealand
European Rowing Championships medalists